Popova Šapka (literally "the priest's hat"; , literally "hill of the sun") is a peak in North Macedonia.

Mountains of North Macedonia
Ski areas and resorts in North Macedonia